Michael Costa may refer to:

 Michael Costa (conductor) (1808–1884), Italian-born conductor and composer
 Michael Costa (politician) (born 1956), Australian politician
 Michael Costa (American football), American football coach
 Mike Costa, American comic book and television writer

See also
 Michel Fernando Costa (1981–2017), Brazilian footballer
 Michael Kosta, (born 1979), American comedian